Pure is the first internationally released album by Christchurch, New Zealand soprano Hayley Westenra. It became the highest selling New Zealand Album, which Westenra was awarded by at the New Zealand Music Awards of 2004. It was published by the Decca Music Group label in 2003. It was distributed in the United States by Universal Classics in 2004. During its first week of sales it sold 19,068 copies. As of 2007, Pure is the best selling classical album for the 21st century in the UK, and in New Zealand remains the best selling album from a New Zealand artist.

Pure gives a new freshness to well known classical repertoire, as well as exploring the world of pop and traditional Maori choral singing, including renditions of "Who Painted the Moon Black?", "Hine e Hine" (a song in Māori), "In Trutina", from Orff's Carmina Burana, "Wuthering Heights" (a cover of the Kate Bush hit), and the perennial spiritual classic "Amazing Grace". Sir George Martin co-wrote the track "Beat of Your Heart" just for the album. Also on the album is "Pokarekare Ana", a New Zealand love song which has enduring popularity, and has become Hayley's signature song. "Never Say Goodbye" is an adaptation of the tune from Maurice Ravel's solo piano piece Pavane pour une infante défunte.

Pure topped the New Zealand Album Chart for eighteen weeks, being certified 12× Platinum, as well as topping the Australian and UK Classical Album Charts.

Pure was recorded at Air Lyndhurst, Eastcote Studios, London, England.

Track listing

New Zealand version 

 Who Painted the Moon Black
 Beat of Your Heart
 Never Say Goodbye
 Dark Waltz
 Heaven
 In Trutina
 Across the Universe of Time
 River of Dreams
 Wuthering Heights
 My Heart and I
 Benedictus
 Hine E Hine
Collector's edition bonus CD
 Pokarekare Ana
 Amazing Grace
 The Mummers' Dance
 Mary Did You Know
 Silent Night Holy Night
 Away in a Manger

Australian version 
 Across The Universe of Time
 Never Say Goodbye
 Beat of Your Heart
 Pokarekare Ana
 Who Painted The Moon Black?
 River of Dreams
 Benedictus
 Hine E Hine
 Dark Waltz
 Amazing Grace
 My Heart And I
 In Trutina
 Heaven
 Wuthering Heights
 Pokarekare Ana (duet with Russell Watson)
Collector's edition bonus CD
 Silent Night
 Away in a Manger
 Mary Did You Know
 The Mummers' Dance

UK version 
 Pokarekare Ana   
 Never Say Goodbye   
 Who Painted the Moon Black?   
 River of Dreams   
 Benedictus   
 Hine e Hine   
 Dark Waltz   
 Amazing Grace   
 In Trutina   
 Beat of Your Heart   
 Heaven   
 Wuthering Heights   
 Hine e Hine (Māori mix)
Collector's edition bonus CD
 Mary Did You Know
 Bridal Ballad
 Pokarekare Ana (Vocalise)
 My Heart And I
 Across the Universe of Time
 Silent Night, Holy Night
 Away in a Manger

US version 
 Pokarekare Ana (Come Back to Me) – 3:18
 Never Say Goodbye – 3:13
 Who Painted the Moon Black? – 3:38
 River of Dreams – 4:21
 Beat of Your Heart – 3:13
 Amazing Grace – 3:42
 Benedictus – 3:50
 Hine E Hine (Maiden, O Maiden) – 5:06
 Across the Universe of Time – 3:42
 Dark Waltz – 4:18
 In Trutina (From Carmina Burana) – 2:22
 Heaven – 4:09
 Wuthering Heights – 3:44

Japanese version 
 ポカレカレ・アナ (マオリ族の伝承歌 / arr. Sarah Class) (Pokarekare Ana)
 ネヴァー・セイ・グッバイ（ラヴェル：亡き王女のためのパヴァヌからの編曲） (Never Say Goodbye)
 フー・ペインティッド・ザ・ムーン・ブラック (Sonia Aletta Nel / arr. Sarah Class) (Who Painted the Moon Black?)
 リヴァー・オブ・ドリームス (ヴィヴァルディ：四季 – 冬からの編曲 / arr. Sarah Class) (River of Dreams)
 ベネディクトゥス (Karl Jenkins) (Benedictus)
 ヒネ・エ・ヒネ (マオリ族の子守歌 / arr. Sarah Class) (Hine e Hine)
 ダーク・ワルツ (Author Frank Musker / arr. Sarah Class) (Dark Waltz)
 マイ・ハート・アンド・アイ (TVドラマ「ラ・ピオーヴラ」主題歌) (My Heart and I)
 イン・トゥルティナ (オルフ：カルミナ・ブラーナからの編曲) (In Trutina)
 ビート・ユア・ハート (サー・ジョージ・マーティン / Giles Martin) (Beat of Your Heart)
 アクロス・ザ・ユニバース・オブ・タイム (Sarah Class) (Across the Universe of Time)
 ヘヴン (Frank Musker / Ronan Hardiman) (Heaven)
 嵐が丘 (Kate Bush / arr. Sarah Class) (Wuthering Heights)
 ．メアリー・ディド・ユー・ノウ？ [ボーナス・トラック] (Mary Did You Know?) (bonus track)
 ．アメイジング・グレイス (arr.サー・ジョージ・マーティン) (「白い巨塔」主題歌)[ボーナス・トラック] (Amazing Grace) (bonus track)

International version

Personnel
Hayley Westenra (vocals)
Giles Martin (guitar, keyboards, programming)
Robbie McIntosh (guitar)
Tony Ingelby (guitar)
Dave Hartley (piano)
James Brett (keyboards)
Steve Pearce (bass)
Mark Brown (bass)
Andres Kallmark (programming)
Mary Hammond (background vocals)
Royal Philharmonic Orchestra

Charts

Weekly charts

Year-end charts

Certifications

See also
 List of best-selling albums in New Zealand

References

External links 
 Samples can be heard on the artist's site
 This album is featured on Yahoo! LAUNCHcast and it can be heard on their Internet Radio Station (you can purchase and download the album from here also)
 Comment on album by The BBC
 Walmart offers both a physical edition and a downloadable version for purchase
 FYE offers physical copies only for purchase

Hayley Westenra albums
2003 albums
2004 albums
Classical crossover albums
Albums recorded at AIR Studios